The Coca Museum (in Spanish, Museo de la Coca) covers the history of the coca plant from the Andean region and related drug cocaine. It is associated with the International Coca Research Institute (ICORI) in La Paz, the government seat in Bolivia. A travelling version of the museum is available.

See also 
 List of museums in Bolivia

References

External links 
 Coca Museum website

Museums in La Paz
La Paz
Buildings and structures in La Paz Department (Bolivia)